Sophie Muir (born 7 May 1983) is an Australian speed skater and a former inline speed skating world champion. Muir was selected in the Australian squad to compete in the Women's 500 metres and Women's 1000 metres, at the 2010 Winter Olympics at Vancouver.

External links
Profile - Australian Olympic Winter Team.

Living people
1983 births
Sportswomen from New South Wales
Australian female speed skaters
Olympic speed skaters of Australia
Speed skaters at the 2010 Winter Olympics
Sportspeople from Sydney